The Bristol Neptune was a seven-cylinder air-cooled radial engine developed in 1930. It had the same size cylinders as the earlier Mercury and Titan engines, 5.75 in (146 mm) x 6.5 in (165 mm) which gave a displacement of 1,182 cu in (19.3 L) and produced a maximum of 320 horsepower (239 kW). The Neptune was effectively a seven-cylinder version of the Titan.

Applications
Bristol Type 110

Specifications (Neptune I)

See also

References

Notes

Bibliography

 Lumsden, Alec. British Piston Engines and their Aircraft. Marlborough, Wiltshire: Airlife Publishing, 2003. .

Aircraft air-cooled radial piston engines
Neptune
1930s aircraft piston engines